David A. Holmberg (born July 19, 1991) is an American professional baseball pitcher who is a free agent. He has played in Major League Baseball (MLB) for the Arizona Diamondbacks, Cincinnati Reds, and Chicago White Sox.

Career

Chicago White Sox
Holmberg was drafted by the Chicago White Sox in the second round, 71st overall, of the 2009 Major League Baseball Draft out of Port Charlotte High School in Port Charlotte, Florida. He made his professional debut with the rookie-level Bristol White Sox, posting a 4.73 ERA in 14 games. He was assigned to the rookie-level Great Falls Voyagers to begin the 2010 season and recorded a 4.46 ERA in 8 games.

Arizona Diamondbacks
On July 31, 2010, Holmberg, along with Daniel Hudson, was traded to the Arizona Diamondbacks in exchange for Edwin Jackson. Holmberg finished the year with the rookie-level Missoula Osprey, recording a 3.86 ERA in 7 starts. In 2011, Holmberg split the year between the Single-A South Bend Silver Hawks and the High-A Visalia Rawhide, accumulating a 12-9 record and 3.44 ERA in 27 starts between the two teams. The following year, Holmberg split the season between Visalia and the Double-A Mobile BayBears, pitching to a cumulative 11-8 record and 3.32 ERA with 153 strikeouts in 173.1 innings of work.

Prior to the 2013 season, Holmberg was ranked by Baseball America as the Diamondbacks' sixth-best prospect. The Diamondbacks promoted Holmberg to the major leagues for the first time on August 27, 2013. He made his MLB debut the same day, allowing 3 runs in 3.2 innings against the San Diego Padres. He finished his rookie year with his debut being his sole appearance with Arizona, with a 2.75 ERA in 26 games with Mobile.

Cincinnati Reds
On December 3, 2013, Holmberg was traded to the Cincinnati Reds in a three-team deal also involving the Tampa Bay Rays. He was assigned to the Triple-A Louisville Bats to begin the 2014 season.

On July 6, 2014, the Reds announced Holmberg will be called up July 8, to pitch the second game of a day/night doubleheader vs. the Chicago Cubs. He was sent back down after the game, but was called up to Cincinnati again on August 21. Holmberg started that night's game against the Atlanta Braves, but gave up six runs in two and two-thirds innings and picked up the loss. He was optioned to Louisville the next day. He finished the season with a 4.80 ERA in 7 appearances for the Reds. On July 29, 2015, the Reds announced Holmberg would pitch the next day to fill in for the empty starting pitching rotation spot, formerly held by Johnny Cueto who was traded to the Kansas City Royals earlier that week. Holmberg spent most of the 2015 season in Louisville and logged a 1-4 record and 7.62 ERA in 6 starts with Cincinnati. On October 30, 2015, Holmberg was outrighted off of the 40-man roster. He elected free agency on November 6.

Atlanta Braves
On December 3, 2015, Holmberg signed a minor league contract with the Atlanta Braves organization that included an invitation to spring training. On March 30, 2016, Holmberg was released by the Braves.

Chicago White Sox (second stint)
On March 31, 2016, Holmberg signed a minor league contract with the Chicago White Sox organization. He split the season between the Double-A Birmingham Barons and the Triple-A Charlotte Knights, pitching to an 8-9 record and 3.84 ERA in 28 appearances between the two teams. He was assigned to Charlotte to begin the 2017 season. On May 4, 2017, Holmberg was selected to the 40-man roster and recalled to the majors. He made his White Sox debut the next day against the Kansas City Royals, allowing a run in two-thirds of an inning. On August 11, Holmberg was outrighted off of the 40-man roster and sent to Triple-A. On September 1, Holmberg was re-selected to the active roster. In 37 appearances on the year with Chicago, Holmberg posted a 2-4 record and 4.68 ERA with 33 strikeouts in 57.2 innings of work. On October 4, Holmberg was again outrighted off of the 40-man roster, and elected free agency on October 10.

Baltimore Orioles
On February 7, 2018, Holmberg signed a minor league contract with the Baltimore Orioles organization. He was released by the Orioles organization on March 30.

Colorado Rockies
On April 9, 2018, Holmberg signed a minor league contract with the Colorado Rockies. He spent the year with the Triple-A Albuquerque Isotopes, and posted a 7-8 record and 5.21 ERA with 65 strikeouts in 107.0 innings of work. He elected free agency on November 3, 2018.

Somerset Patriots
On May 13, 2019, Holmberg signed with the Somerset Patriots of the independent Atlantic League of Professional Baseball. Holmberg pitched in 20 games for Somerset, logging a 2-8 record and 5.17 ERA. He became a free agent following the season.

Milwaukee Milkmen
On April 9, 2020, Holmberg signed with the Milwaukee Milkmen of the American Association. Holmberg posted a 6-1 record and 2.34 ERA in 12 games with Milwaukee and won the American Association championship with the team. In 11 appearances with Milwaukee in 2021, Holmberg logged a 7-3 record and 4.33 ERA.

Saraperos de Saltillo
On July 17, 2021, Holmberg signed with the Saraperos de Saltillo of the Mexican League. Holmberg 
recorded a 0-0 record and 3.60 ERA and 20 strikeouts in 3 starts and 1 relief appearance with Saraperos. On August 12, 2021, Holmberg was released by the Saraperos.

Milwaukee Milkmen (second stint)
On August 16, 2021, Holmberg re-signed with the Milwaukee Milkmen of the American Association of Professional Baseball.

Pericos de Puebla
On January 28, 2022, Holmberg signed with the Pericos de Puebla of the Mexican League. In 5 starts, Holmberg went 1-1 with a 6.86 ERA over 19.2 innings. He was released on July 14, 2022.

References

External links

1991 births
Living people
Albuquerque Isotopes players
Arizona Diamondbacks players
Baseball players from Florida
Birmingham Barons players
Bristol White Sox players
Charlotte Knights players
Chicago White Sox players
Cincinnati Reds players
Great Falls Voyagers players
Louisville Bats players
Milwaukee Milkmen players
Missoula Osprey players
Mobile BayBears players
Naranjeros de Hermosillo players
American expatriate baseball players in Mexico
Pericos de Puebla players
People from Port Charlotte, Florida
Port Charlotte High School alumni
Somerset Patriots players
South Bend Silver Hawks players
Visalia Rawhide players
American expatriate baseball players in Australia
American expatriate baseball players in Colombia